Frank Needham (27 August 1861 – 15 October 1923) was an English first-class cricketer active 1890–1901 who played for Nottinghamshire. He was born and died in Arnold, Nottinghamshire.

References

1861 births
1923 deaths
English cricketers
Nottinghamshire cricketers
Marylebone Cricket Club cricketers
H. Philipson's XI cricketers